CBC Concert Hour is a Canadian music television series which aired on CBC Television from 1954 to 1955.

Premise
This Montreal-produced series featured classical music, concentrating particularly on chamber music. Artists featured included Maureen Forrester, Ernest MacMillan, John Newmark, Elisabeth Schwarzkopf, Andrés Segovia and Joseph Szigeti. Boyd Neel and Wilfred Pelletier were among the conductors seen on CBC Concert Hour. Irving Gutman was the series stage director.

Scheduling
This hour-long series was broadcast Thursdays at 8:30 p.m. (Eastern) from 30 September 1954 to 30 June 1955. An earlier episode was broadcast on 27 June 1954.

References

External links
 

CBC Television original programming
1950s Canadian music television series
1954 Canadian television series debuts
1955 Canadian television series endings
Black-and-white Canadian television shows